The South African Railways Class 20 2-10-2 of 1935 was a steam locomotive.

In 1935, the South African Railways placed one Class 20 steam locomotive with a  Santa Fe type wheel arrangement in service, designed and built at its Pretoria Mechanical Shops. In 1950, it was modified to an experimental condensing locomotive.

The Class 20 was the third locomotive type to be designed and built in South Africa, after the Natal Government Railways 4-6-2TT Havelock of 1888 and the Class 2C of 1910.

Construction
The Class 20 2-10-2 Santa Fe type steam locomotive was designed in 1934 by A.G. Watson, Chief Mechanical Engineer of the South African Railways (SAR) from 1929 to 1936, and was built by the SAR at its Pretoria Mechanical Shops at Salvokop. The locomotive was intended for use on the South West Africa system, where the tracks consisted of  section rail laid in desert conditions and practically without ballast.

The sole Class 20 locomotive was numbered 2485. It was a hybrid, with a boiler which had been inherited from a Class 19A locomotive which had been equipped with a Watson Standard no. 1A boiler. The driving wheels were from scrapped Class 8 locomotives. The trailing pony truck was similar to that of the Class 19C, but the leading Bissel truck was specially designed. The bar frames and cylinders were imported.

Even though it was not wholly a South African product with its imported frames and cylinders and its inherited boiler from a Swiss-built locomotive, this was the third recorded instance of steam locomotives designed and constructed in South African workshops after the Natal Government Railways' engine Havelock of 1888 and the Class 2C of 1910.

Characteristics
The modified cylinder covers had deep spigots to suit the reduction in stroke. The main drive and valve gear drive was from the third pair of coupled wheels. Grease lubrication was provided for all coupled wheel axle boxes. The ten-coupled wheel arrangement, in conjunction with the sharp curvature of the lines in South West, necessitated special side play for the leading coupled wheel axle boxes and spherical bearings for the leading crank pins.

The design of the leading Bissel truck necessitated certain proportions to suit the ten-coupled wheel arrangement, but the trailing Bissel truck was similar to that of the Class 19C. Its axle boxes were provided with end thrust pad bearings attached to the axle box covers, which relieved the ends of the bearing from the effects of end thrust. This device proved successful in reducing the number of hot boxes on trailing Bissels.

The locomotive was tended by a Type MP1 tender with a  coal capacity, a  water capacity and a  axle load.

Watson disliked articulated locomotives and his aim with the Class 20 was to build an as powerful as possible non-articulated locomotive with a maximum  axle load. The resulting Class 20 could be considered as Watson's answer to the Class GCA Garratt locomotive which had very similar weight and tractive effort capacities. Even so, only one Class 20 was produced and the design was not repeated.

The construction of this sole Class 20 locomotive marked the beginning of a research process which was continued two years later with the construction of the sole Class 21 2-10-4 and which eventually culminated in the procurement of the Class 23 4-8-2 fleet in 1939.

Service
The locomotive was intended for goods traffic on light rail in South West Africa, even though freight traffic volumes in that territory were hardly enough to justify such a powerful engine. It was sent to various branches in the Eastern Transvaal to undergo tests before it entered service in South West Africa, but after some evidence that the engine was rather severe on the light track, it was returned to South Africa after comparatively short service. It was then allocated to Pretoria for working on the Eastern Transvaal System where its power capacity could be used more productively.

Photographs show that, after being returned to Pretoria, the engine's Type MP1 tender was replaced by a larger Type MT2 tender with a  coal capacity, a  water capacity and a  axle load. The Pretoria enginemen considered the Class 20 to be one of their best locomotives since it was free-steaming, more than usually trouble-free and able to handle any load they gave it.

Condensing trials
The arid nature of a large part of South Africa and the consequent difficulty to ensure adequate and suitable water supplies for steam locomotives led to a decision to experiment with condensing locomotives. Such locomotives had by then already been built by Henschel and Son for use in Argentina, 240 Kriegsloks for the Eastern Front in Germany in the 1930s and more than 4,000 units of the Russian SOK class, mainly for use in Turkestan and other arid regions of the Soviet Union. In the pre-war years, the SAR considered modifying a Class 12A into a condensing locomotive, but this never happened.

In 1950, the Class 20 was modified to an experimental condensing locomotive in the Pretoria workshops, fitted with German Witte-style smoke deflectors, an extension to the chimney and a Type CL condensing tender which had been ordered from Henschel in 1948. This condensing tender, with Henschel works no. T28388, was designed for a Deutsche Reichsbahn Class 52 condensing locomotive. It was modified slightly and was equipped with a pair of Buckeye three-axle bogies instead of the German arrangement of one six-wheeled and one four-wheeled bogie. It had an  coal capacity, a  water capacity and a  axle load.

The Type CL tender was designed in such a way that it could also be used on a modified Class 19D or Class 24, but this was never done. As on the later Class 25 condensing locomotives, the pipe to feed spent steam back to the condensing tender was mounted on the left side of the engine. It was run back from the smokebox above the running board to a box that contained a centrifuge and filters to remove cylinder lubricant from the exhaust steam, then below the running board and underneath the cab to the tender. The tender had six large radiators on each side, cooled by three exhaust steam-driven roof-mounted fans which drew air from outside through the radiators.

Beginning in 1951, tests with the condensing Class 20, named Pretoria, were conducted in the Eastern Transvaal and the Karoo. It proved the viability of condensing locomotives in South Africa by attaining a saving of between 88% and 93% on water as well as a lower coal consumption, the latter brought about by the higher temperature of the condensed feedwater.

At the end of 1951, the locomotive was relocated to Touws River where it was used for further condensing tests and occasionally put to work in regular service. The positive results of the condensing trials led to the introduction of the Class 25 condensing locomotive fleet in 1953.

At that time, no. 2485 was again relocated, this time to De Aar for service on the section via Prieska to Upington on the line to Windhoek in South West Africa. It remained in service there until 1958. Even though its service record and uniqueness justified preservation, it was scrapped in 1961.

Illustration
The pictures illustrate the Class 20 locomotive as built with a Type MP1 tender, then fitted with a larger capacity Type MT2 tender, and finally after modification to an experimental condensing locomotive with a Type CL tender.

References

2030
2030
2030
2-10-2 locomotives
SAR locomotives
Cape gauge railway locomotives
Railway locomotives introduced in 1935
1935 in South Africa
Scrapped locomotives